The 2002 Mountain West Conference men's basketball tournament was played at the Thomas & Mack Center in Las Vegas, Nevada from March 7–9, 2002.  San Diego State upset tournament host UNLV, who returned to league tournament play following a one-year ban due to recruiting violations, 78–75 to win the MWC Tournament and the league's automatic NCAA Tournament bid.  Though the league had only existed for three years, SDSU became the lowest seed (5) to win the Mountain West Conference tournament in the league's short history.

Bracket

References

Mountain West Conference men's basketball tournament
Tournament
Mountain West Conference men's basketball tournament
Mountain West Conference men's basketball tournament